William Brian Foley (28 November 1919 – 11 October 2000) was a Roman Catholic priest and hymnwriter.

He was educated at St Mary's College, Crosby and Upholland, where he was ordained a priest in 1945.

He became the parish priest of Clayton Green, Chorley, Lancashire. Foley lamented the loss of plainsong and the traditional Roman Catholic style of worship after Vatican II. Fourteen hymns written by Foley are included in the 1971 New Catholic Hymnal.

References

Further reading
 An English-speaking hymnal guide, Erik Routley and Peter Cutts, Gia Publications, 2005

1919 births
2000 deaths
People from Crosby, Merseyside
20th-century English Roman Catholic priests
Clergy from Liverpool
People educated at St Mary's College, Crosby
English hymnwriters
20th-century English musicians